Addararachchige Gunendra Kamal (born on 5 February 1962), popularly as Kamal Addararachchi, is an actor in Sri Lankan cinema, theatre and television, as well as a singer and presenter.Widely regarded as one of the greatest Sinhala actors of all time , Addaraarachchi made his debut as an actor in Gamini Fonseka's 1981 film Sagarayak Meda, whilst he was a still a student at school. Since the late 1970s, he has appeared in a variety of roles in many films and teledramas. He has acted in over 40 films, 20 teledramas and 6 stage plays, and won the Sarasaviya Best Actor Award for his role of Sobana in Jayantha Chandrasiri's film Agnidahaya in 2002.

He also made a mark as a singer in 1993 with "Unmadawoo," a duet with Damayanthi Jayasooriya, which was featured in the film Saptha Kanya. He was also the host of the first three seasons of Sirasa Superstar, a reality show, and first season of Hiru Mega Stars.

Background
He completed his education from Wesley College, Colombo.

He showed an initial interest in artistic work, and this prompted him to do music, Sinhala literature, Kandyan Dancing and debating, all at the same time. He even worked as the secretary of the 'Sinhala Literary Society' whilst at school.

He is married to Anurani Addararachchi and has two sons. He was an English teacher as well.

Career
The play, Ane Ablick, was staged in Colombo in 1978, marked Kamal's first significant public theatre performance. Addararachchi, who broke into the silver screen with Gamini Fonseka's Sagarayak Meda rose to immense popularity with hits such as Saptha Kanya.

He is noted for his performances in films such as Saptha Kanya by H. D. Premaratne, Agnidahaya by Jayantha Chandrasiri and teldramas like Hiruta Muvaven by Herbert Ranjith Peiris, Rathu Rosa by Ranjan De Silva, and Weda Hamine and Dandubasna Maanaya by Jayantha Chandrasiri.

His performance on the mini screen for Dandubasna Maanaya was twice rewarded at the inaugural Sumathi Tele Awards ceremony in 1995, when he received the award for Best Supporting Actor as well as the Most Popular Actor Award. Kamal consider Dinal Samaranake a leading player as his mentor who was always prepared to offer valuable advice for himself especially when his spirits are down.

In July 2012, he appeared his first music video, with Mahendra Perera and Dayan Witharana, for the song, "Hithagaawa" by Tilan Fernando and directed by Prasanna Andradi. The music video was released in first week of December 2012.

He has not appeared in a teledrama since 2005 and not been to a movie in four years since 2017.

Awards
1995 – Sumathi Best Supporting Actor Award
1995 – Sumathi Most Popular Actor Award
1996 – Best Supporting Actor Presidential Award
2002 – Sarasaviya Best Actor Award

Filmography

Songs

References

External links

Kamal Addararachchi's Biography in Sinhala Cinema Database
Kamal Addararachchi Songs
නාම යෝජනා නොලැබුණේ ඇයි ?

1962 births
Living people
20th-century Sri Lankan male singers
Sinhalese male actors
Sri Lankan male film actors
Alumni of Wesley College, Colombo
Sinhalese singers